Guilliermondia is a genus of fungi within the Sordariaceae family.

The genus is named in honour of Marie Antoine Alexandre Guilliermond (1876 - 1945), who was a French  botanist (Mycology, Bryology and Zytology) and a Professor in Lyon.

The genus was circumscribed by Jean Louis Émile Boudier in Bull. Soc. Mycol. France vol.20 on page 19 in 1904.

References

External links
Guilliermondia at Index Fungorum

Sordariales